Elżbieta Anna Krawczuk-Trylińska (5 October 1960 – 13 December 2017) was a Polish athlete who specialised in the high jump. She won silver and bronze medals at the 1981 European Indoor Championships and 1987 European Indoor Championships respectively. She also represented her country at the 1980 Summer Olympics narrowly missing the final.

Her personal best was 1.94 metres both indoors (Grenoble 1981) and outdoors (Warsaw 1986).

International competitions

1No mark in the final

References

1960 births
2017 deaths
Polish female high jumpers
Athletes (track and field) at the 1980 Summer Olympics
Olympic athletes of Poland
Sportspeople from Białystok
SGH Warsaw School of Economics alumni